The  Mandela family is a South African political dynasty and chiefly family. Its most prominent member was Nelson Mandela, who served as President of South Africa from 1994 to 1999.

History
The Mandelas are direct descendants of the AmaHala ruling dynasty of the Thembu people; as a result, their leader has traditionally had a hereditary claim to both membership of the Thembu king's privy council and the chieftaincy of the town of Mvezo that is subject to his authority.

The family was started in the 18th century, when King Ngubengcuka of the Thembus married and left a son named Mandela, the first of the direct line to bear the name. Prince Mandela was a son of a woman that belonged to the Ixhiba clan, a ritually inferior family when compared to his father's AmaHalas, and therefore his cadet branch of the dynasty was deemed to be morganatic. Due to this, in lieu of having a place in the line of succession, he and his heirs were recognized as privy councillors thereafter.

The prince's own son, Gadla Henry Mphakanyiswa Mandela, was later also given the title of the chief of Mvezo by his relative, the king of Thembuland, as a further marker of the family's eminence. After being lost in the Apartheid era, this chieftaincy has since been restored to the Mandelas.

During the title's abeyance, the claim to it passed to Chief Mandela's son Nelson, who would never inherit it. Following his renunciation of it in order to become active in the anti-Apartheid movement, it would later pass to his sons Thembekile and Makgatho, and following their own early deaths, to Makgatho's son Mandla. Chief Mandla Mandela would ultimately succeed to the title in 2007 following its restoration.

Prominent members
 President Nelson Mandela, anti-Apartheid activist, humanitarian and head of state
 Dr. Winnie Madikizela-Mandela M.P., anti-Apartheid activist and politician, ex-wife of Nelson Mandela
 Princess Zenani Mandela-Dlamini of eSwatini, diplomat and Swazi princess, daughter of Nelson Mandela
 Ambassador Zindzi Mandela-Hlongwane, diplomat, daughter of Nelson Mandela
 Chief Mandla Mandela M.P., politician and traditional aristocrat, grandson of Nelson Mandela (through Makgatho)

Other members
 Prince Cedza Dlamini, Swazi prince and humanitarian, step-grandson of Nelson Mandela (through Zenani)
 Evelyn Mase, nurse, ex-wife of Nelson Mandela
 Dr. Graça Machel D.B.E., politician and humanitarian, widow of Nelson Mandela
 Makaziwe Mandela, businesswoman, daughter of Nelson Mandela
 Makgatho Mandela, lawyer, son of Nelson Mandela
 Ndaba Mandela, humanitarian, grandson of Nelson Mandela (through Makgatho)
 Ndileka Mandela, activist, granddaughter of Nelson Mandela (through Thembekile)
 Thembekile Mandela, son of Nelson Mandela 
 Zoleka Mandela, writer and activist, granddaughter of Nelson Mandela (through Zindzi)

References

Bibliography
Guiloineau, Jean; Rowe, Joseph (2002). Nelson Mandela: The Early Life of Rolihlahla Madiba. Berkeley: North Atlantic Books. pp. 9–26. ISBN 978-1-55643-417-4.
 Lodge, Tom (2006). Mandela: A Critical Life. Oxford: Oxford University Press. ISBN 978-0-19-921935-3.

Political families
African royal families
African dynasties